Mario Antonio Romero (born 15 March 1980 in Buenos Aires) is an Argentine football striker who currently plays for Dinamo Tirana in the Albanian Superliga.

Career
Romero signed for Dinamo Tirana on January 28, 2009 after initially going on a short trial at the Albanian club on January 28, 2009. He signed a contract that would keep him at the club until the end of the season with an option of another year. During his trial he followed the Dinamo Tirana squad to Turkey during the winter break where he played friendly games, including a match against Terek Grozny of Russia where he scored a goal.

References

External links

Goal.com profile

1980 births
Living people
Argentine footballers
Footballers from Buenos Aires
Expatriate footballers in Albania
Argentine expatriate footballers
Association football forwards
FK Dinamo Tirana players